Serghei Alexandrov (born 26 February 1965 or 15 May 1965) is a former Moldovan footballer who played as forward.

Between 1992 and 1998, Alexandrov played six matches for the Moldova national football team, scoring five goals, four of them in a single match: on 18 August 1992, against Pakistan, thus scoring the first hat-trick in Moldova's national team history.

Honours

Club
Bugeac Comrat
Divizia Națională
Silver medal: 1992

Moldovan Cup: 1992

Individual
Bugeac Comrat
Divizia Națională Top scorer: 1992 (13 goals; shared with Oleg Flentea)

International goals

References

1965 births
Living people
People from Bender, Moldova
Moldovan footballers
Moldova international footballers
Moldovan Super Liga players

Association football forwards